As Suqayyan is a small coastal village in the Lahij Governorate of south-western Yemen. It is located 12.4 km northeast by road from Hisn Murad.

References

External links
Photograph of the coast

Populated places in Lahij Governorate
Populated coastal places in Yemen